Hafia Football Club is a football club based in Conakry, Guinea. Founded in 1951, the team was known as Conakry II in the 1960s and won three titles under that name. Hafia have won 15 league titles overall having dominated in 1960s and 70s, but their last league title coming in 1985. The 1970s were a golden decade for Hafia FC when they dominated African football having won the African Cup of Champions Clubs three times, in 1972, 1975 and 1977. It promoted some great talents as Papa Camara, Bengally Sylla, Abdoulaye Keita, Chérif Souleymane, Petit Sory, Mamadou Aliou Kéïta.

In early 2021 construction began on the new stadium "Stade Petit Sory" named after Hafia FC legend Petit Sory

Golden Age
Hafia's golden age was the 70s when they became African Cup of Champions Clubs three times, in 1972, 1975 and 1977. During this period they were one of the greatest clubs in Africa. Their players included Papa Camara, Abdoulaye Keita, and Petit Sory.

Kit provider

Current squad

Honours

Domestic
 Ligue 1 Pro: 15
Champion: 1966, 1967, 1968, 1971, 1972, 1973, 1974, 1975, 1976, 1977, 1978, 1979, 1982, 1983, 1985

Guinée Coupe Nationale: 4
Winner: 1992, 1993, 2002, 2017

Continental
 African Cup of Champions Clubs: 3
Champion: 1972, 1975, 1977
Runner-up: 1976, 1978

 UFOA Cup:
Runner-up: 1992

Performance in CAF competitions
CAF Champions League: 1 appearance
2020 – Preliminary Round

 African Cup of Champions Clubs: 14 appearances

1967: Quarter-finals
1968: Quarter-finals
1969: Semi-finals
1972: Champion
1973: Quarter-finals

1974: withdrew in Second Round
1975: Champion
1976: Finalist
1977: Champion
1978: Finalist

1979: Quarter-finals
1980: Second Round
1983: Second Round
1984: withdrew in First Round

CAF Cup Winners' Cup: 3 appearances
1993 – First Round
1994 – First Round
2003 – Second Round

Notes and references

External links
 Hafia Conakry history – scoreshelf.com

 
Football clubs in Guinea
Sport in Conakry
1951 establishments in Guinea
CAF Champions League winning clubs